The Expressway network of Vietnam is a recent addition to the transport network of Vietnam.

Development

Expressways are a rather recent addition to the Vietnamese road network, and standardization has not been fully implemented. Ownership varies by expressway, they are financed, developed, owned and operated by either state-owned or private companies on behalf of the Ministry of Transport. For example, state-owned Vietnam Expressway Corporation owns and operates four expressways, but toll collection is done by subcontracted companies. The companies operating the expressways have to report traffic numbers and toll revenue to the Ministry of Transport and the Directorate for Roads of Vietnam. This construction has been subject of fraud investigations several times, as  toll revenue was falsified by the collecting companies in order to take advantage of the difference. The government has also threatened operating companies to revoke their toll collection licence after lack of maintenance caused dangerous situations on several expressways. In 2019 it was reported that the Vietnam Expressway Corporation was $3.7 billion USD in debt, and earning $137 million in revenue each year.

The total cost of the planned expressway network is estimated at $47.9 billion. Lack of funding has been an issue throughout the development of the expressway network, with both the government and private investors having difficulty in raising the required investment costs.

In 2019, the Ministry of Transport decided to exclude foreign investors from bidding on the North-South expressway, mainly to prevent Chinese companies from participating. Public backslash – due to strong anti-Chinese sentiment in the country – was feared if Chinese companies would collect toll fees, as well national security concerns playing a role in this decision. However, lack of bidders has led to low competition between the bids,  and two out of five sections had not attracted any bids.

In 2020, Minister of Planning and Investment Nguyễn Chí Dũng petitioned to the National Assembly to switch development of the remaining sections of the North–South expressway to state funding instead of build-operate-transfer contracts, in order to avoid delays in raising capital and to reduce interest amount. He noted that Chinese provinces Yunnan and Guangxi built  of expressways in three years, whereas  of planned expressway in Vietnam should have been completed decades ago. If public funding would be approved, construction on the sections Vĩnh Hảo (vi)–Phan Thiết, Mai Son (Ninh Bình)–Highway 45 (Thanh Hóa) and Phan Thiết–Dầu Giây (connection to Ho Chi Minh City–Long Thanh–Dau Giay Expressway) would start in 2021.

Expressway use

Generally all cars, buses, trucks, types of tricycles (excluding motor cyclos) and motorcycles over 175cc ((usually identified as xx + (A) + (1-9), where xx is the series of provinces according to regulations) are permitted on the expressway but công nông (agricultural vehicles) and motorcycles under 175cc (usually identified as xx + (B to Z) + (1-9), where xx is the series of provinces according to regulations) are not,.

List of expressways

Expressways Network planning in 2021

North–South Expressway

Northern Regional Expressway

Central Regional Expressway

Southern Regional Expressway

Hanoi Ring Road

Ho Chi Minh City Ring Road

Expressways Network planning in 2015

See also

 Transport in Vietnam

Notes

References

External links
Website of the Ministry of Transport